Cottonville (also Cottonville Store) is an unincorporated community in Tate County, Mississippi, United States.

Notes

Unincorporated communities in Tate County, Mississippi
Unincorporated communities in Mississippi